The politics of Normandy regulate the political and governmental administration. The modern region was created on 1 January 2016 by reunification of the separate regions Lower Normandy and Upper Normandy. Rouen is the regional capital, while Caen is the seat of the regional council.

The new region took effect on 1 January 2016, after the regional elections in December 2015.

Government 

The Regional Council which has 102 members who are elected under a system of proportional representation. The executive consists of a president and vice-presidents.

President

See also 
 Politics of France

References

External links

Politics of France
Normandy